Robert Paul Gilkerson (February 10, 1886 – March 21, 1944) was an American Negro league second baseman in the 1900s and 1910s, and later owner of the eponymous Gilkerson's Union Giants club.

A native of Newtown, Virginia, Gilkerson played for the Illinois Giants in 1909, and for the Leland Giants in 1913. In 1917, he bought 
W. S. Peters' Chicago baseball club, and ran his barnstorming Gilkerson's Union Giants through the 1930s. Gilkerson died in Spring Valley, Illinois in 1944 at age 58.

References

External links
Baseball statistics and player information from Baseball-Reference Black Baseball Stats and Seamheads

1886 births
1944 deaths
Illinois Giants players
Leland Giants players
20th-century African-American people
Kansas City Giants players